Sergey Konstantinovich Medvedev (June 2, 1958, in Kaliningrad) is a Russian journalist and TV presenter who would later become the Press Secretary of Russian President Boris Yeltsin from 1995 to 1996.

Biography
Sergey Medvedev was born on June 2, 1958 in Kaliningrad. His interest in journalism started from an early age, his career beginning in a local paper. In 1981 he graduated from Moscow State University’s Faculty of Journalism, having also been trained at Gosplan economics courses. 

From 1981 to 1991 he worked in the USSR State Committee for Television and Radio Broadcasting (Radio and Television of the USSR). In this capacity he served as a presenter for Vremya’s replacement program TV-Inform.

Between 1995 and 1996 he was the press secretary of the Russian President Boris Yeltsin. Following his resignation as press secretary, Medvedev returned to television and became the first deputy general director of ORT. In 2000, Medvedev took part in the elections to the State Duma from the Kaliningrad district number 84 as an independent candidate, but the results of voting placed him second.

Together with  he is the founder of one of the largest broadcasting companies of the country Ostankino, which creates the content for the first and other federal channels in Russia. Since 2003 Medvedev has been the Chairman of the Board of Directors.

He is a member of the Russian Union of Journalists and the Union of Cinematographers of Russia.

References

External links
 Sergey Medvedev Online  Кино-Театр.ру

1958 births
Living people
1st class Active State Councillors of the Russian Federation
People from Kaliningrad
Soviet journalists
Russian male journalists
Russian journalists
Russian television presenters
Kremlin Press Secretaries